Stephen Lambert  may refer to:

Stephen Lambert (field hockey) (born 1979), Australian field hockey goalkeeper
Stephen Lambert (media executive) (born 1959), British media executive
Stephen Lambert (editor), American TV editor

See also
Steve Lambert (born 1976), American artist